Paul Hufford was a football player for the University of Iowa from 1982-1984.  He was twice named All-Big Ten and was the first player to win the Big Ten’s Defensive Lineman of the Year award in 1984.

Background

Paul Hufford was born in Keokuk, Iowa, but he moved to Mount Vernon, Iowa, before high school.  Hufford was a standout athlete at Mount Vernon from 1976-1980.  He lettered in four sports and won state championships in wrestling and track.  Despite suffering a knee injury his senior year of high school, he earned a scholarship to the University of Iowa, where his older brothers, Joe and Mike Hufford, were football letterwinners.

Iowa career

Paul Hufford earned football letters from 1982-1984.  As a junior in 1983, he was an all-Big Ten selection at defensive tackle.  Paul Hufford served as a captain of the 1984 Hawkeye football team, and Iowa finished with an 8-4-1 record and a victory in the 1984 Freedom Bowl.  He was an all-Big Ten selection for the second time, and the Big Ten named him the first winner of its Defensive Lineman of the Year award after his senior season in 1984.

References

Iowa Hawkeyes football players
Living people
People from Keokuk, Iowa
People from Mount Vernon, Iowa
Year of birth missing (living people)